Bruce Robinson Stannard (August 20, 1879 - May 30, 1954) was a member of the United States Army during the Spanish–American War and World War I; he also served in the California State Assembly for the 79th district from 1933 to 1935.

References

United States Army personnel of World War I
American military personnel of the Spanish–American War
20th-century American politicians
Republican Party members of the California State Assembly
1879 births
1954 deaths